Dragica Cepernić is a Croatian football defender currently playing in the Croatian 1st Division for ŽNK Osijek, with whom she has also played the Champions League. She has been a member of the Croatian national team.

References

1981 births
Living people
Croatian women's footballers
Croatia women's international footballers
Women's association football defenders
Croatian Women's First Football League players
ŽNK Osijek players